Agylla umbrifera is a moth of the family Erebidae. It was described by Felder in 1874. It is found in Colombia, Venezuela and Bolivia.

References

Moths described in 1874
umbrifera
Moths of South America